Lester Cole (June 19, 1904 – August 15, 1985) was an American screenwriter. Cole was one of the Hollywood Ten, a group of screenwriters and directors who were cited for contempt of Congress and blacklisted for their refusal to testify regarding their alleged involvement with the Communist Party.

Biography
Born to a Jewish family in New York City, the son of Polish immigrants to the United States, his father was a Marxist garment industry union organiser, and Cole was a dedicated socialist from childhood.

Lester Cole began his career as an actor but soon turned to screenwriting. His first work was If I Had a Million. In 1933, he joined with John Howard Lawson and Samuel Ornitz to establish the Writers Guild of America, and in 1934 joined the American Communist Party.

Between 1932 and 1947, Cole wrote more than forty screenplays that were made into motion pictures.

Blacklisting
In 1947, he became one of the Hollywood Ten, who refused to answer questions before the House Committee on Un-American Activities about their Communist Party membership. Cole was convicted of Contempt of Congress, fined $1,000 and sentenced to twelve months' confinement at the Federal Correctional Institution at Danbury, Connecticut, of which he served ten months.

As a result of his refusal to testify, Cole was blacklisted by studio executives, after which just three of his screenplays were made into films - submitted under the names Gerald L.C. Copley, Lewis Copley, and J. Redmond Prior.

His best-known screenplay was that for the highly successful Born Free (1966), credited to Gerald L.C. Copley.

Personal life
Cole was married three times. His first two marriages ended in divorce and he separated from his third wife. 

Cole married his first wife Jeanne “Jonnie” March in 1935. Together they joined the Communist party. The couple had two sons and divorced in 1953. In the mid 1950s he briefly married Isabel (Dowden) Johnson, who later married Alger Hiss.  Cole and Katharine Hogle married in 1956 and separated in 1977.

Later life
In 1981, Cole published his autobiography, entitled Hollywood Red: The Autobiography of Lester Cole. In it, he recounted a 1978 incident when he called into a radio talk show on which ex-Communist Budd Schulberg was a guest. According to Cole, he berated Schulberg (who had testified before HUAC as a friendly witness) on the air as a "canary" and a "stool pigeon" before he was cut off:

About this incident, Kenneth Lloyd Billingsley (Hollywood Party: How Communism Seduced the American Film Industry) comments, "Whether this actually happened is uncertain, but one can guess."

Lester Cole died of a heart attack in San Francisco, California, in 1985. Ronald Radosh, Emeritus Professor of History at City University of New York, wrote that Cole "remained a hardcore Communist" until his death.

Selected filmography
 Painted Faces (1929)
 Walls of Gold (1933)
 Nothing More Than a Woman (1934)
 The Crime of Doctor Hallet (1938)
 Secrets of a Nurse (1938)
 Pirates of the Skies (1939)
 The House of the Seven Gables (1940)
 Pacific Blackout (1941)
 Among the Living (1941)
 None Shall Escape (1944)
 Blood on the Sun (1945)
 Objective, Burma! (1945)
 Men in Her Diary (1945)
 The Romance of Rosy Ridge (1947)
 High Wall (1947)

See also

 The Hollywood Ten documentary.
 Hollywood on Trial

References

External links
 .
 

1904 births
1985 deaths
Writers from New York City
American male screenwriters
Jewish American screenwriters
Hollywood blacklist
Members of the Communist Party USA
Screenwriters from New York (state)
20th-century American male writers
20th-century American screenwriters